Ranjay Ray Choudhury  commonly known as Ranjay RC is a film director, photographer and artist. He debuted his directorial venture with 2013 Bengali film The Play.

Career
Ranjay started his career as an artist and has presented solo painting exhibitions on Mahanayak Uttam Kumar (2004) and Michael Jackson (2009) at Academy of Fine Arts, Kolkata. At 2010 he shifted to direction with a short film 32 Canal Street. His first venture of a full-length feature film is the Bengali film The Play in 2013. He also wrote the story and screenplay of this film. The film features Rajesh Sharma, Indrasish Roy, Mumtaz Sorcar, Rajdeep Gupta and Sampurna Chakraborty in the lead roles. The music and the background score of The Play has been composed by Joy Sarkar. The film revolves around a theatre group where the entire theatre group is devastated by a series of murders. The filming began in December 2012 and was wrapped up by January 2013. The film was released on 6 December 2013.

Filmography
2013: The Play || Director

Videography
2014: Dhana Dhanya Pushpa Bhara || Director, Cinematographer
2015: I for Independence || Director, Cinematographer
2015: Kotha || Director, Cinematographer
2016: Khabor Diyo Hothat kanna Pele || Director, Cinematographer
2016: Dhaka TO Kolkata || Cinematographer
2016: Maya || Director, Cinematographer
2017: Dhulo Hawa Jhare || Director, Cinematographer
2017: Du Haath Barie || Director, Cinematographer
2017: Be My Guide || Director, Cinematographer
2017: Eki Labonye || Cinematographer
2017: Krishna Preme || Director, Cinematographer
2017: Dosar Rabindranath || Director, Cinematographer
2018: O Je Manena Mana || Director, Cinematographer
2018: Mor Bina || Cinematographer
2018: Aaro Dao Praan || Cinematographer
2018: BHILAI ANTHEM || Director, Cinematographer
2018: Syian Sadan || Director, Cinematographer
2018: Bum Chik Chik Bum || Director, Cinematographer

Documentary Film
2017: Ashoka Chakra Karnataka (DocumentaryFilm)  || Director, Cinematographer

Short Film

2015: I for Independence  || Direction || Cinematographer
2017: #mayera mitha kotha bole  || Cinematographer
2017: Baba'ra thaake..ei bhaabe..nisshobde..  || Cinematographer
2017: Uma || Cinematographer
2018: Ek bachchan e bohu bachchan  || Direction || Cinematographer
2019: 50 takar chobi || Direction || Cinematographer
2019: Cold Coffee  || Direction || Cinematographer
2020: Matri  || Direction || Cinematographer
2021: Vidyang Dehi  || Direction || Cinematographer

References

External links

1979 births
Living people
Film directors from Kolkata
Bengali film directors
Bengali male artists